Abu-al-Tayyab Muhammad Shams-al-Haq bin Shaikh Ameer ‘Ali bin Shaikh Maqsood ‘Ali bin Shaikh Ghulam Haidar bin Shaikh Hedayetullah bin Shaikh Muhammad Zahid bin Shaikh Noor Muhammad bin Shaikh ‘Ala’uddin, also known as Shams-ul-haq Azeemabadi, was a scholar of Hadith from India. He is best known for writing the main commentary upon Sunan Abi Dawud.

Life
He was born in Patna, formerly known as Azimabad, and received his Islamic education from Syed Nazeer Husain.

In 1894 he traveled to Mecca and Medina to perform the Hajj, and while there, he also had a chance to meet a number of scholars. Among the most important contributions of Azimabadi was the popularization and distribution of hadith and its literature.

Azimabadi had a very extensive library of Islamic manuscripts, which was considered to be among the best in India. He is the author of many books, but his most well known are the commentaries of Sunan Abi Dawood, which is called Ghayat ul-Maqsood in 32 volumes and Awn ul-Ma'bood in 14 volumes. Azimabadi was also known for his views on the qualifications for a Mujaddid, or redeemer, in Islam; by his reckoning, Al-Suyuti and Murtaḍá al-Zabīdī were two prominent redeemers.

In 1910–11 the entire country was in the grip of an epidemic of plague. In Bihar, Azimabadi’s district, Patna was severely hit by this disease. After visiting the city of Dianwan on 15 March he had himself an attack of plague and after six days, on 21 March 1911 he died at the age of 53.

Works
Awn al Mabud: a commentary on Abu al-Tayyib Muhammad Shams al-haqq al-azim Abadi's interpretation of Sunan Abi Dawud. 3rd ed. Beirut: Dar al-Fikr, 1979.

Citations

External links
Website dedicated to promote his life and works

1857 births
1911 deaths
Writers from Patna
Indian Sunni Muslim scholars of Islam
Indian Salafis
Atharis
19th-century Indian philosophers
Ahl-i Hadith people